Thracia pubescens is a bivalve mollusc in the family Thraciidae.

Description
The ovate shell is oblong, transverse, equilateral, inequivalve and slightly inflated. it is of a reddish white color, covered with a browner shagreened epidermis, and marked with irregular and more or less numerous striae of increase. The beaks are short, and that of the right valve is notched at its summit to receive that of the left valve. The valves are pretty thick, rounded at the anterior, and truncated at the posterior side. The same side is separated from the upper surface by an obtuse angle, which arises from the posterior extremity of the beaks, and which descends obliquely as far as the lower extremity of the shell. The cardinal edge is rather thin, and destitute of teeth. It presents at the posterior side of the beaks an internal hollow, short and thick. The hollow is oblique and bounded outwardly by a little ridge, in which is inserted an external ligament, whilst another strong ligament is situated in the hollows of the valves. Interiorly they are white, smooth and polished. There exists upon the anterior side a muscular impression, long and very narrow in its middle, very near the edge.  The posterior muscular impression is rounded and pretty large.

Distribution
Thracia pubescens is found in the North Atlantic Ocean, off Spain, the Azores and the Canary Islands and West Africa.  It is distributed widely round the coasts of Britain and Ireland where it burrows in sandy or muddy substrates, extending its siphons to the surface to breathe and feed. It is also found  in the Mediterranean Sea (Greece, Italy).

References

 Pulteney R., 1799: Catalogue of the birds, shells, and some of the more rare plants of Dorsetshire; London, Nichols pp. 92 
 Lamarck ([J.-B. M.] de), 1815-1822: Histoire naturelle des animaux sans vertèbres ; Paris [vol. 5: Paris, Deterville/Verdière] [vol. 6 published by the Author] 7 vol. [I molluschi sono compresi nei vol. 5-7. Vol. 5 (Les Conchiferes): 612 pp. [25 luglio 1818]. Vol. 6 (1) (Suite): 343 pp. [1819]. Vol. 6 (2) (Suite): 232 pp. [1822]. Vol. 7: (Suite): 711 pp. [1822]] 
 Soot-Ryen T., 1941: Northern Pelecypods in the collection of Tromsø Museum ; Tromsø Museums årshefter 1-41, pl. 1-10

External links
 World Wide Mollusc Species Database: Thracia pubescens

Thraciidae
Molluscs described in 1799